Valley Entertainment is an American independent record label and music distributor based in New York City, United States. The company was founded in 1994 by Barney Cohen and Jon Birge. In 2001, it acquired the prestigious back catalogue of space, ambient, and new-age music from Hearts of Space Records. , it has a catalogue of about 375 releases.

History
In 1979, Barney Cohen founded Valley Media (a separate company) and opened Valley Record Distributors in 1984. In 1994, he stepped down from Valley Media to focus on the proprietary independent music label he had started: Valley Entertainment, founded in 1994 by Barney Cohen and Jon Birge.

In 2001, they acquired from Stephen Hill the prestigious trademark and back catalogue of his Hearts of Space Records (including among its about 140 releases such albums as Constance Demby's 1986 Novus Magnificat, Michael Stearns's 1988 Encounter, Rich & Roach's 1990 Strata, Rich & Lustmord's 1995 Stalker, Steve Roach's 1996 The Magnificent Void, Robert Rich's 1998 Seven Veils, and solo albums by Paul Haslinger from Tangerine Dream). As Hill explained, "Despite our success, by 2000 things were getting very difficult for record companies our size, and ultimately we sold the label to a larger company in 2001. Luckily we found Jon Birge of Valley Entertainment, who recognized what we had accomplished and has kept the HOS Records catalog together and available." Though not any more associated with its business side, Stephen Hill continues to work on Artist & Repertoire and to produce new recordings for the label.

Discography

2018
 Winter into Spring: Special Edition - George Winston
 Live - Karla Bonoff

2017
 Epiphany: Meditations on Sacred Hymns - Jonn Serrie
 Ready - Frank Barter
 Faith - Jim Brickman
 Soothe, Volume 3: Meditation - Music for Peaceful Relaxation - Jim Brickman
 Autumn - George Winston
 Dream Cycle - Michael Whalen
 The Assumption - Monastic Choir of the Abbey Notre Dame de Fontgombault

2016
 Soothe 1: Music to Quiet Your Mind & Soothe Your World - Jim Brickman
 Soothe 2: Sleep - Music for Tranquil Slumber - Jim Brickman
 Comfort & Joy - Jim Brickman
 Land Ho! - The Forest Rangers
 Liturgical Treasures from Bulgaria - Various Artists

2015
 Traces of an Old Vineyard - Mahsa Vahdat
 Bird - Lisbeth Scott
 Legacy - Liz Madden

2014
 A Few Images (Algumas Imagens) - Tania Saleh
 Turning Back - Dina El Wedidi
 Songs from a Stolen Spring - Various Artists
 Sacred Songs of Mary 2 - Various Artists
 Hypnosis: Deep House Sitar - Ronobir
 In Search of Divine Light - Divna
 Sacred Songs of the Renaissance - Huelgas Ensemble

2013
 Plains  - George Winston
 December - George Winston
 Sacred Songs of Hope  - Various Artists
 Copper: Original Soundtrack - Brian Keane
 Larry Kirwan's Celtic Invasion - Various Artists

2012
 Sacred Songs of Angels - Various Artists
 Death and the Civil War (Soundtrack) - Brian Keane
 The Long Road Down (Song from the Miniseries Hatfields & McCoys) - Lisbeth Scott
 A Deeper Tone of Longing: Love Duets Across Civilizations - Mahsa Vahdat and Mighty Sam McClain
 Colours - Finbar Furey 
 Angelic Light: Music from Eastern Cathedrals - Cappella Romana

2011
 Sunday Morning Peace - Jonn Serrie 
 One Drop Is Plenty - Mighty Sam McClain & Knut Reiersrud
 Songs From Before - Fionnuala Sherry
 eQuinox - Ralph Zurmühle
 The Queen's Minstrel - Therese Schroeder-Sheker
 State of Grace - Paul Schwartz
 Taproot - Michael Hedges
 Mardi Gras - Cowboy Mouth

2010
 Listen To The Banned - Various Artists
 Sacred Songs of Mary - Various Artists
 Christmas Prayers - Jonn Serrie
 Into the Deep: America, Whaling & The World - Brian Keane soundtrack to Ric Burns documentary
 Scent of Reunion: Love Duets Across Civilizations - Mahsa Vahdat and Mighty Sam McClain
Celtic Woman 4 - Various Artists

2007
Miss Blues'es Child - Eli Cook

According to a statement from its director, the company has claimed being "blacklisted" in 2007 by the George W. Bush administration for releasing in the U.S. the Norwegian album Lullabies from the Axis of Evil.

Labels
, published or distributed labels include the following:
 Sledgehammer Blues (formerly AudioQuest Music) (59 releases)
 Erin (2 releases)
 Hearts of Space Records (150+ releases)
 RGB (6 releases)
 Valley Entertainment-Windham Hill Records (14 reissues)
 Valley Entertainment (120+ releases)

References

Further reading
 SEC filing about the relationship between Valley Media Inc. and Valley Entertainment at SEC.gov (two distinct companies; mostly backstory and business data)

External links
 Valley-Entertainment.com – official website
 Valley Entertainment MySpace

American independent record labels
Ambient music record labels
New-age music record labels
Electronic music record labels
Record labels established in 1996
Record label distributors